José João da Silva Viegas (born 24 August 2003) is an East Timorese swimmer. He competed in the 2020 Summer Olympics.

References

External links
 

2003 births
Living people
Swimmers at the 2020 Summer Olympics
East Timorese male swimmers
Olympic swimmers of East Timor